Ocean of Funk is the debut studio album by American rapper E.S.G. from Houston, Texas. It was released on February 1, 1994 via Perrion Records.

Track listing

Sample credits
9-Trey
"This Is Your Life" by Commodores
Birdies That Don't Chirp
"Voyage to Atlantis" by The Isley Brothers
"Skanless" by DJ Quik
Flipping
"Love and Happiness" by Al Green
Anticipation
"Anticipation" by Bar-Kays
My Real Niggaz
"Ashley's Roachclip" by The Soul Searchers
"Representin' 93" by 2Pac
"Quik's Groove" by DJ Quik
Smoke On
"Float On" by The Floaters

Personnel
Cedric Dormaine Hill – main artist, assistant engineering
Deon Britten – featured artist (tracks: 4, 7, 15)
Lil' Will – featured artist (tracks: 7, 15)
Marcus Bolden – featured artist (track 9)
A. Morgan – featured artist (track 15)
Yellowstone Click – featured artists (track 15)
Sean "Solo" Jemison – producer
Earl Winters – producer
Clay James – mixing & engineering
Robert Earl Davis, Jr. – editor (track 2)
Steven Caldwell – executive producer
Eric Bowen – executive producer
Pen & Pixel – design & layout

References

External links

1994 debut albums
E.S.G. (rapper) albums
Gangsta rap albums by American artists